

CAVE (Citizens Against Virtually Everything), sometimes known as BANANA (Build Absolutely Nothing Anywhere Near Anyone/Anything) is a pejorative term for citizens who regularly oppose any changes in their community, organization or workplace.

The phenomenon is linked to the so-called NIMBY (Not In My Back Yard) attitude. In NIMBYism, residents generally support a policy in principle, but do not support it being applied in their particular area. A common example is wind turbines, where most people are supportive, but do not wish to live near one. 

On the other hand, CAVE/BANANA people do not support the policy in any form, regardless of what local residents or stakeholders feel. This attitude is manifested in opposition to changes in public policy as varied as tax levies, sewer rates, public transportation routes, parking regulations and municipal mergers or annexations.  CAVE/BANANA people often express their views publicly by attending community meetings, writing letters to the local newspaper, or calling in to talk radio shows, similar to NIMBYs. This can sometimes create an effect where those who oppose a policy are more vocal than those who support it or are indifferent, however, exact rates are often difficult to identify.

Examples
The terms "CAVE people" and "BANANAs" were used in a 2022 op-ed to describe the populace of Stamford, Connecticut. The op-ed was written by a former municipal employee and described CAVE people as seeing "no issue simultaneously arguing conflicting points so long as nothing changes."

Origin
A reference to the term "CAVE dwellers" can be found in the September 30, 1990, edition of the Orlando Sentinel. The term apparently existed before the publication of the article.

References

External links
Mention in the Orlando Sentinel, September 30, 1990
Definition at Word Spy

Activism
Pejorative terms for people
Political terminology